Below is a list of the 2nd National Assembly of the Republic of Namibia. The members were in the National Assembly from the 1994 election to 1999 election. Members are chosen by their parties. Parties are voted in via proportional representation.

South West Africa People's Organization
 Mose Penaani Tjitendero Speaker of the National Assembly
 Zephania Kameeta Deputy Speaker of the National Assembly 
 Hage Geingob Prime Minister 
 Hendrik Witbooi  
 Vekuii Rukoro
 Nangolo Mbumba 
 Johannes Mutorwa 
 Philemon Malima 
 Helmut Angula
 Nickey Iyambo 
 Hifikepunye Pohamba 
 Theo-Ben Gurirab 
 Ben Amathila
 Nahas Angula
 Ngarikutuke Tjiriange
 Moses ǁGaroëb
 Richard Kabajani 
 Marco Hausiku
 Andimba Toivo ya Toivo 
 Libertine Amathila 
 Hidipo Hamutenya 
 Gert Hanekom 
 Hampie Plichta 
 Pendukeni Ithana 
 Stan Webster
 Clara Bohitile 
 Erkki Nghimtina 
 Abraham Iyambo
 Netumbo Ndaitwah 
 Iyambo Indongo
 Buddy Wentworth
 Jerry Ekandjo 
 Daniel Tjongarero
 John Shaetonhodi 
 Hadino Hishongwa
 Michaela Hübschle
 Ben Ulenga
 Jesaja N Nyamu 
 Klaus Dierks 
 Nico Bessinger
 Anna Bayer
 Willem Biwa(Resigned 1996) 
 Bernard Esau
 Edward Goeieman
 Gertrud Kandanga-Hilukilwa 
 Petrus Iilonga 
 Nangolo Ithete 
 Willem Konjore 
 Nathaniel Maxuilili 
 Angelika Muharukua
 Ellen Musialela
 Jeremiah Nambinga 
 Alpheus ǃNaruseb 
 Hartmut Ruppel 
 Ignatius Shixwameni
 Pashukeni Shoombe 
 Doreen Sioka 
 Sigfried Wohler

Democratic Turnhalle Alliance 
 Mishake Muyongo
 Johan de Waal
 Allois Gende
 Petrus Junius 
 Rudolf Kamburona
 Katuutire Kaura
 Daniel Luipert
 Phillemon Moongo 
 Andries Mouton
 Kuaima Riruako
 Patricia Siska 
 Hans Erik Staby 
 Mohammed Stuart

United Democratic Front
 Justus ǁGaroëb
 Eric Biwa

Democratic Coalition of Namibia
 Moses Katjioungua

Monitor Action Group
 Kosie Pretorius

References
 Official list National Assembly of Namibia

History of Namibia
Government of Namibia
2nd